Luke station is a flag stop station in Luke, Manitoba, Canada.  The stop is served by Via Rail's Winnipeg – Churchill train. Luke is part of the Town of Gillam, in northeastern Manitoba.

Footnotes

External links 
Via Rail Station Information

Via Rail stations in Manitoba